Skagul Island is an island in the Delarof Islands subgroup of the Andreanof Islands in the Aleutian Islands chain of Alaska. The island measures .

References

External links

Delarof Islands
Islands of Alaska
Islands of Unorganized Borough, Alaska